There are at least 245 named mountains in Lincoln County, Montana.
 A Peak, el. 
 Abe Lincoln Mountain, el. 
 Alaska Peak, el. 
 Alexander Mountain, el. 
 Allen Peak, el. 
 American Mountain, el. 
 Ant Hill, el. 
 Arbo Mountain, el. 
 Banfield Mountain, el. 
 Baree Mountain, el. 
 Barren Peak, el. 
 Beartrap Mountain, el. 
 Beetle Hill, el. 
 Big Creek Baldy Mountain, el. 
 Big Hoodoo Mountain, el. 
 Big Loaf Mountain, el. 
 Black Butte, el. 
 Black Top, el. 
 Blue Mountain, el. 
 Bockman Peak, el. 
 Boulder Mountain, el. 
 Boundary Mountain, el. 
 Bowers Peak, el. 
 Brush Mountain, el. 
 Bunker Hill, el. 
 Burnt Peak, el. 
 Cable Mountain, el. 
 Calx Mountain, el. 
 Canuck Peak, el. 
 Caribou Mountain, el. 
 Carney Peak, el. 
 Chief Peak, el. 
 China Mountain, el. 
 Clark Mountain, el. 
 Clay Mountain, el. 
 Cliff Point, el. 
 Clingback Mountain, el. 
 Conn Mountain, el. 
 Cooney Peak, el. 
 Copper Mountain, el. 
 Cripple Horse Mountain, el. 
 Cross Mountain, el. 
 Cross Mountain, el. 
 Crowell Mountain, el. 
 Davis Mountain, el. 
 Davis Mountain, el. 
 Davis Peak, el. 
 Deep Mountain, el. 
 Dome Mountain, el. 
 Dooley Mountain, el. 
 Doonan Peak, el. 
 Drift Peak, el. 
 Dunn Peak, el. 
 Dusty Peak, el. 
 East Fork Peak, el. 
 Edna Mountain, el. 
 Elk Mountain, el. 
 Ellsworth Mountain, el. 
 Eureka Hill, el. 
 Feeder Mountain, el. 
 Fisher Mountain, el. 
 Flagstaff Mountain, el. 
 Flatiron Mountain, el. 
 Fleetwood Point, el. 
 Flower Point, el. 
 Fosseum Mountain, el. 
 Friday Hill, el. 
 Fritz Mountain, el. 
 Garden Ridge, el. 
 Garver Mountain, el. 
 Goat Mountain, el. 
 Gold Hill, el. 
 Gopher Hill, el. 
 Gordon Mountain, el. 
 Grambauer Mountain, el. 
 Great Northern Mountain, el. 
 Green Mountain, el. 
 Grizzly Point, el. 
 Grouse Mountain, el. 
 Grubstake Mountain, el. 
 Gunsight Mountain, el. 
 Gus Brink Mountain, el. 
 Haystack Mountain, el. 
 Helmer Mountain, el. 
 Hensley Hill, el. 
 Herrig Mountain, el. 
 Horse Hill, el. 
 Horse Mountain, el. 
 Houser Peak, el. 
 Huckleberry Mountain, el. 
 Huson Peak, el. 
 Inch Mountain, el. 
 Independence Mountain, el. 
 Independence Peak, el. 
 Indian Head, el. 
 Indian Peak, el. 
 Jumbo Peak, el. 
 Keeler Mountain, el. 
 Kenelty Mountain, el. 
 Kenelty Mountain, el. 
 Keno Mountain, el. 
 Keystone Mountain, el. 
 King Mountain, el. 
 Kootenai Mountain, el. 
 Krag Peak, el. 
 Krinklehorn Peak, el. 
 Ksanka Peak, el. 
 Lawrence Mountain, el. 
 Lick Mountain, el. 
 Lightning Peak, el. 
 Lime Butte, el. 
 Lindy Peak, el. 
 Little Hoodoo Mountain, el. 
 Little Sutton Mountain, el. 
 Little Tom Mountain, el. 
 Loon Peak, el. 
 Lost Horse Mountain, el. 
 Lost Horse Mountain, el. 
 Lost Soul Mountain, el. 
 Lucky Point, el. 
 Lydia Mountain, el.

See also
 List of mountains in Montana
 List of mountain ranges in Montana

Notes

LincolnA-L